Incheon Transit Corporation (인천교통공사), formerly known as Incheon Rapid Transit Corporation (인천지하철공사) currently operates the Incheon Subway, Wolmi Sea Train, Incheon Bus information, Incheon Bus Terminal, Call taxi for the handicapped in Incheon, South Korea, established in 1993. In 2011 Incheon Transit Corporation merged with ′Incheon Metro′, established in 1998 to operate Incheon Subway Line 1,  Incheon Subway Line 2, the section of Seoul Subway Line 7 between Kkachiul & Seongnam, & the Incheon Airport Maglev. In the future it also has plans to operate Line 3.

See also
Seoul Metropolitan Subway
Korail, operator of lines 1, 3, 4 (partial), the Suin-Bundang Line, the Gyeongui-Jungang Line, the Gyeonggang Line & the Gyeongchun Line.
Seoul Metro, operator of lines 1-8
Transportation in South Korea

References

External links

Incheon Transit Corporation official website

Railway companies of South Korea
Transport operators of South Korea
Transport in Incheon